The following are the national records in athletics in Brazil maintained by Brazilian athletics federation, Confederação Brasileira de Atletismo (CBAt).

Outdoor
Key to tables:

+ = en route to a longer distance

h = hand timing

A = affected by altitude

NWI = no wind information

a = aided road course according to IAAF rule 260.28

# = not officially ratified by federation or/and IAAF

OT = oversized track (> 200 m in circumference)

Men

Women

Mixed

Indoor

Men

Women

Notes

References
General
CBAt: Brazilian Records 24 July 2022 updated
Specific

External links
CBAt web site

Brazil
Records
athletics
Athletics